Star People is a 1983 album recorded by Miles Davis and issued by Columbia Records. It is the second studio recording released after the trumpeter's six-year hiatus, the first to feature electric guitarist John Scofield, who was recommended by saxophonist Bill Evans, and the last to be produced by long-standing collaborator Teo Macero. 

Bassist Marcus Miller, who would go on to produce future Davis sessions, plays on five of the tracks. Electric guitarist Mike Stern features on most of the pieces, and drummer Al Foster and percussionist Mino Cinelu round out the rhythm section. Davis played trumpet and Oberheim synthesizer simultaneously (without using overdubs), and also on separately recorded interludes for the over-18-minute-long blues "Star People". The album was re-released as a part of the boxed set Miles Davis: The Complete Columbia Album Collection in 2009, and was further remastered and reissued in 2022.

Reception
In a contemporaneous review, music writer Greg Tate wrote:

Track listing
All tracks composed by Miles Davis

Personnel 
 Miles Davis – trumpet, keyboards
 Mike Stern – electric guitar 
 John Scofield – electric guitar (2, 3)
 Marcus Miller – electric bass (1, 2, 4, 5, 6)
 Tom Barney – electric bass (3)
 Al Foster – drums
 Mino Cinelu – percussion
 Bill Evans – soprano saxophone, tenor saxophone
 Gil Evans – arrangements (uncredited)

Production 
 Dr George Butler – executive producer
 Teo Macero – producer
 Don Puluse – recording and remix engineer at CBS Studios (New York City)
 Jay Messina – recording engineer at Record Plant (New York City)
 Ron Lorman – remote sound engineer 
 Bill Messina, Ken Robertson, Lou Schlossberg and Harold Tarowski – engineers
 Mark Allison, Chris Murphy and Jim Rose – technician assistants
 Joe Gastwirt – mastering at Frankford/Wayne Mastering Labs (New York City)
 Miles Davis – "all drawings, color concepts and basic attitudes"
 Janet Perr – cover design
 John Berg – art direction
 Leonard Feather – liner notes

References

1983 albums
Miles Davis albums
Albums arranged by Gil Evans
Albums produced by Teo Macero
Columbia Records albums